Ronald Shaw Meyer (February 17, 1941 – December 5, 2017) was an American college and professional football coach. He is best known for having been the head coach of Southern Methodist University and the New England Patriots and Indianapolis Colts of the National Football League (NFL).

Biography
Meyer's head coaching career began at University of Nevada, Las Vegas (UNLV), then in Division II, where he led the Rebels from 1973 through 1975.  In 1974, UNLV had an undefeated regular season at 11–0; and advanced to the semifinals (Grantland Rice Bowl) in the Division II playoffs.

In January 1976, Meyer was hired as the head coach at Southern Methodist University in Dallas, where he led the Mustangs for six seasons.  This tenure included winning the Southwest Conference championship in 1981 with running backs Eric Dickerson and Craig James. While at SMU, Meyer was the losing coach in the famous "Miracle Bowl" in the 1980 Holiday Bowl, where SMU held a 45–25 lead against BYU with less than four minutes to play in the fourth quarter, only to lose 46–45 thanks to three touchdown passes from Cougar quarterback Jim McMahon.

Meyer moved to the pros in 1982, where he coached the New England Patriots for three seasons.  He was named the AFC Coach of the Year in his first season where he led the New England Patriots to the playoffs in the strike-shortened  season after the team had finished with the league's worst record the prior season.  He is perhaps best remembered by New England fans for coaching during the infamous Snowplow Game against the Miami Dolphins on December 12, 1982.  Under heavy snow at Foxboro Stadium with 4:45 remaining in the game, the Patriots lined up for a go-ahead field goal.  Meyer called for a stadium worker named Mark Henderson (who was on a prison work release) to drive his snowplow on the field in order to clear an area for holder Matt Cavanaugh to spot the ball and to give kicker John Smith better footing.  The Patriots went on to win the game, 3–0, on their way to their first playoff appearance since the 1978 season.

In 1984, Meyer was fired in midseason despite having a 5–3 record and was replaced by Raymond Berry.  The move was prompted by team-wide alienation of players on Meyer's part, to where Patriots GM Patrick Sullivan was forced to hold player-only meetings.  Meyer responded by firing assistant coach Rod Rust, though he did not have authority to do so.  He was fired soon after. Rust was rehired by Berry, and the Patriots reached Super Bowl XX in 1985 and won the AFC East Division Title in 1986. Rust became head coach upon Berry's resignation after the 1989 season, but was fired after a disastrous 1–15 campaign in 1990.

Meyer spent over a year out of coaching after being dismissed by the Patriots.  After initially agreeing to accept the open Head Coach position at his collegiate alma mater, Purdue; Meyer accepted the now vacant Indianapolis Colts head coach position.  When he accepted the job late in the 1986 season, the Colts were 0–13 at the time.  Meyer promptly led the Colts to 3 straight victories to finish 3–13. A year later, he won the AFC East Division title with the Colts where he once again won the AFC Coach of the Year. Meyer was helped in large part by being reunited with his former college standout, Eric Dickerson, who was acquired by the Colts in a three-team, 10-player trade involving the Los Angeles Rams and Buffalo Bills.

The Colts did not return to the playoffs under Meyer, slipping by one game in each of the next three seasons, from 9-7 in 1988, to 8–8 in 1989 and 7–9 in 1990, despite the selection of quarterback Jeff George with the first overall pick in the 1990 draft. He was widely criticized in trading up in the draft to obtain George, which included sending star players, receiver Andre Rison, lineman Chris Hinton, and the Colts' first round pick in 1991 to the Atlanta Falcons. George's short-lived stint in Indianapolis did not make matters better. In 1991, when the Colts started off 0–5, he was let go.

The year after his dismissal from Indianapolis, Meyer became an analyst for CNN's Pro Football show.  He would remain in that role for two seasons.

In 1994, Meyer returned to coaching again.  This time Meyer became the head coach of the Canadian Football League's Las Vegas Posse franchise.  The Posse finished the season 5–13.  In addition to the poor record, the team suffered from poor attendance and eventually was caught in an ownership debacle. Meyer was to be fired if the team's proposed move to Mississippi went through, but when it did not, and the Posse's roster was dispersed, the franchise's next potential owners in Miami (see: Miami Manatees (CFL)) had planned on retaining Meyer as coach, but the team folded before playing a single game. Meyer would return to his role at CNN in 1995.

In 2001, Meyer returned to coaching, this time as part of the XFL's Chicago Enforcers franchise.  The team would finish 5–5 and would lose to the eventual champion, the Los Angeles Xtreme, in the league semifinals.  After the season, the XFL folded.

In his later years, he was an NFL analyst for the show The Score on the NFL on the Canadian sports channel The Score.

Meyer died on December 5, 2017, at age 76 from an aortic aneurysm while playing golf with friends in Lakeway, Texas.

Head coaching record

College

NFL

CFL

XFL

References

1941 births
2017 deaths
American football defensive backs
American football quarterbacks
Indianapolis Colts coaches
Chicago Enforcers coaches
Dallas Cowboys scouts
Deaths from aortic aneurysm
New England Patriots coaches
New England Patriots head coaches
Players of American football from Columbus, Ohio
Purdue Boilermakers football coaches
Purdue Boilermakers football players
Purdue University alumni
SMU Mustangs football coaches
Sportspeople from Columbus, Ohio
UNLV Rebels football coaches
Indianapolis Colts head coaches